The Atlantic Council of Serbia is a non-governmental and non-profit organization in Serbia. Founded in 2001, the organization promotes Serbia's Euro-Atlantic integration.

References

External links

Atlantic Council of Serbia - official website

2001 establishments in Serbia
Political organizations based in Serbia
European integration think tanks